Rams or RAMS may refer to:

 Male sheep

Places
 Rams (Ras Al Khaimah), a settlement in the United Arab Emirates

People
 Dieter Rams, (born 1932), German industrial designer
Joaquin Rams, (born 1972), American murderer and suspected serial killer.

Arts, entertainment, and media
 Rams (2015 film), a 2015 Icelandic drama by Grímur Hákonarson
 Rams (2018 film), a documentary about German industrial designer Dieter Rams
 Rams (2020 film), a 2020 Australian remake of the 2015 Icelandic film
 Rams (card game), a European plain tricking card game related to Nap and Loo; also called Rounce

Sports teams
 Adelaide Rams, a former Australian rugby league club
 AFC Croydon Athletic, an English association football club from London
 Colorado State Rams, the athletic teams of Colorado State University, Fort Collins, Colorado, United States
 Bury Town F.C., an English association football club from Bury St Edmunds
 Derby County F.C., an English association football club
 Dewsbury Rams, an English rugby league team
 Fordham Rams, the athletic teams of Fordham University, New York City, New York, United States
 Framingham State University, Framingham, Massachusetts, United States, sports teams
 Greater Sydney Rams, an Australian rugby union team
 Los Angeles Rams, an American football team (NFL)
 Nürnberg Rams, an American football team from Nuremberg, Germany
 Overbrook High School (New Jersey), home of the Rams sports teams
 Rawalpindi Rams, a Pakistani cricket team
 Ryerson Rams, the athletic teams of Ryerson University, Toronto, Ontario, Canada
 Rhode Island Rams, the sports teams of the University of Rhode Island in Kingston, Rhode Island, United States
 Shepherd University, Shepherdstown, West Virginia, United States sports teams
 St. John's College (Harare), Zimbabwe, sports teams
 VCU Rams, the sports teams of Virginia Commonwealth University, Richmond, Virginia, United States

Other uses
 RAMS, an acronym for Reliability, Availability, Maintainability and Safety
 RAMS Home Loans, an Australian mortgage broker, now a subsidiary of Westpac Bank
 Regional Atmospheric Modeling System, or RAMS, a collection of atmospheric simulation, data analysis, and visualization software
 Research Activity Management System, or RAMS
 Risk Assessment Management System or Risk Assessment and Method Statements, also called RAMS
 Roseville Area Middle School, or RAMS, a Minnesota Middle School

See also
 Ram (disambiguation)
 Ram's horn (disambiguation)